Mirano is a town and comune in the Metropolitan City of Venice, Veneto, Italy.

People
Luigi Brugnaro (born 1961), politician and current mayor of Venice (since 2015)
Federica Pellegrini (born 1988), Olympic swimmer, multiple world-record holder and Olympic gold medalist.
Michele Campagnaro (born 1993), International Rugby Player, Italy and Exeter Chiefs.
Alberto Mondi (born 1984), celebrity in Korea

References

Cities and towns in Veneto